Knotroot is a common name for several plants, and may refer to:

 Stachys affinis
 Collinsonia canadensis

See also 
 Knotroot bristle-grass (Setaria parviflora)